Fres is a village and former municipality in the Chania regional unit, Crete, Greece. Since the 2011 local government reform, it is part of the municipality Apokoronas, of which it is a municipal unit. Fres has a population of 326 (2011). The city has a large main square surrounded by several cafés where the locals in the village meet and socialize. An archway in Fres leads through to the upper village and to the chapel of Our Lady of the Two Rocks.

It takes in foothills of the White Mountains (Lefka Ori). The settlements in Fres are Paidochori, Pemonia, Tzitzifes, Melidoni and Fres village.

See also
List of settlements in the Chania regional unit

References

Populated places in Chania (regional unit)